Jumana, meaning "silver pearl", is an Arabic feminine given name. 

People with the name include:
 Jumana El Husseini (born 1932), a Palestinian painter and sculptor living in Paris
 Jumana Emil Abboud, Palestinian artist
 Jumana Ghunaimat, Jordanian journalist and politician
 Joumana Haddad, a Lebanese author, public speaker, journalist and women's rights activist.
 Jumana Hanna, Iraqi woman
 Jumana Murad, Syrian actress and producer
 Jumana Nagarwala, an Indian-American physician who, in 2017, became the first person charged under the United States law criminalizing female genital mutilation

See also
Atikah

Arabic feminine given names